Joseph H. Hardgrove (November 26, 1870 – November 19, 1953) was an American physician, educator, and politician.

Born in Fond du Lac, Wisconsin, Hardgrove worked in the cooper trade. In 1903, Hardgrove graduated from Oshkosh Normal School (now University of Wisconsin–Oshkosh). He then was principal of a school in Tigerton, Wisconsin and helped organized the Tigerton High School. Hardgrove then became principal of Manawa High School in Manawa, Wisconsin. Hardgrove received his medical degree from Marquette University Medical School in 1916 and then practiced medicine in Eden, Wisconsin. Hardgrove served as president of the Fond du Lac Rural Normal School Board and was a Democrat. In 1933, Hardgrove served in the Wisconsin State Assembly. In 1953, Hardgrove died at the house of a daughter in Shawano, Wisconsin.

Notes

1870 births
1953 deaths
Politicians from Fond du Lac, Wisconsin
People from Tigerton, Wisconsin
Marquette University alumni
University of Wisconsin–Oshkosh alumni
Educators from Wisconsin
Physicians from Wisconsin
School board members in Wisconsin
People from Eden, Wisconsin
Democratic Party members of the Wisconsin State Assembly